Thomas William  Druce (born June 18, 1961) is a former Republican member of the Pennsylvania House of Representatives. He represented the 144th legislative district in Bucks County.

He graduated from William Tennent High School in 1979 and from Westminster College (Pennsylvania) in 1983. He was sworn into the Pennsylvania House of Representatives in 1993 and was elected to four terms.

In July 1999 while driving, Druce struck and killed 42-year-old Harrisburg pedestrian Kenneth Cains, a former US Marine. He was convicted and served time for this offense.

Death of Kenneth Cains
In July 1999, while driving, Druce struck and killed 42-year-old Harrisburg pedestrian Kenneth Cains, a former United States Marine.

After attempting to cover his tracks by repairing his Jeep SUV, filing a false accident claim with his insurance company and lying to police, Druce eventually pled guilty to a hit and run for leaving the scene of an accident, as well as insurance fraud and tampering with evidence.

Although he admitted to a night of drinking before the hit-and-run, he was able to avoid additional drunk driving charges because too much time had passed to test his blood-alcohol level. He was sentenced to two to four years at SCI Laurel Highlands.

This crime was the subject of an episode of Forensic Files titled "Capitol Crimes".

Later
According to the information Druce posted on the LinkedIn site, as of February 2020, he worked as the principal of Phoenix Strategy Group, "a research and public policy firm" and doing business development for Pennsylvania Water Specialities Company.

References

Living people
1961 births
Westminster College (Pennsylvania) alumni
People from Bucks County, Pennsylvania
Republican Party members of the Pennsylvania House of Representatives
Pennsylvania politicians convicted of crimes
American politicians convicted of fraud